The Albion United States Post Office, also known as U.S. Post Office-Albion in Albion in Boone County, Nebraska, was built in 1939.  It was listed on the National Register of Historic Places in 1992.

This is one of 12 Nebraska post offices featuring a Section of Fine Arts mural, "Nebraska in Winter" (1939) by Jenne Magafan.

It is a one-story brick building with simple Colonial Revival details.

References

External links

Post office buildings on the National Register of Historic Places in Nebraska
Colonial Revival architecture in Nebraska
Government buildings completed in 1939
Buildings and structures in Boone County, Nebraska
1939 establishments in Nebraska